Orthotylus is a genus of bugs from the family Miridae. There are more than 300 described species worldwide. The sheer number of species has led to the recognition of subgenera and groups, some of which may be promoted to genus level. Yamsunaga recognized the genus as non-monophyletic, and without consistent diagnostic characteristics.

Most of the species are plant feeders, some of them attacking important crops; however, some species also prey on the larvae of lepidoptera and diptera, as well as on psyllids and aphids.

Partial list of subgenera
 Ericinellus type species: Orthotylus ericinellae
 Orthotylus
 compactus group, type: Orthotylus compactus
 priesneri group, type: Orthotylus priesneri
 Melanotrichus type species: Orthotylus flavosparsus
 Pseudorthotylus type species: Orthotylus bilineatus

See also
 List of Orthotylus species

References

 
Miridae genera
Orthotylini